is a Japanese tokusatsu show, being the 15th show in the Ultra Series. Produced by Tsuburaya Productions, Ultraman Neos was initially intended as a TV series but the project was shelved. Years later, Tsuburaya turned the concept into a 12-episode direct-to-video series. In spite of the appearance of similar designs and a cameo by Zoffy, the series is set in an alternate universe.

Toku premiered the series in the United States with English subtitles on May 1, 2017. On Friday, September 29 the entire series was made available for viewing on Verizon's go90.

Plot

In the first decade of the 21st century, Earth has crossed over the Unbalance Zone once in every 3 million years, which caused various unnatural phenomenon on Earth to occur. Having survived the destruction of a space satellite, Genki Kagura was bonded to Ultraman Neos as they fight against the monster brought to life by the Dark Matter mutations with the assistance of HEART and a fellow Ultra veteran, Ultraseven 21. During that time, Kagura crosses paths with Alien Zamu, a race of extraterrestrial aliens who took refuge on Earth when their planet was ravaged by the effects of Dark Matter. In the final episodes, Mensch Heit try to exterminate this alien race by sending Grall and threatened the Japanese defense forces for cooperation. With Neos and Seven 21 nearly died from exhaustion, Esura, the last surviving Alien Zamu sacrificed his life to replenish both Ultras as they defeated the demonic ruler and avenge the extinct alien race. Neos and Seven 21 returned to their home planet as the former separated from Kagura and HEART vowing to restore the Zamu race.

Episodes

Cast
 : 
 : 
 : 
 : 
 : 
 : 
 : 
 : 
 , skinhead leader (12): 
 : 
 : 
 Narrator: 

Guest Cast

 Unnamed girl: 
 : 
 : 
 Hino's father: 
 : 
: 
 : 
 :

Songs
Opening song
"Ultraman Neos"
Lyrics: 
Composition: 
Arrangement: , 
Artist: , Project DMM (TYPE 2001)
The original version (1995) appeared as an insert song in the 1995 short pilot. For the opening of the 12 episode series, it was labelled as "TYPE 2001" during its marketing in said year.

Ending song
"IN YOUR HEART"
Lyrics: Goro Matsui
Composition/Arrangement: Kazuya Daimon
Artist:  and Project DMM
Usually the first verse is played in the entire season, but the second and third is combined and played for the final episode.

Insert song
"Ultraseven 21"
Lyrics: Gorō Matsui
Composition: Kisaburō Suzuki
Arrangement: Tatsumi Yano (1995), Kazuya Daimon (TYPE 2001)
Artist: Tatsuya Maeda (1995), Project DMM (TYPE 2001)
The original version (1995) appeared as an insert song in the 1995 short pilot. For the same purpose in episode 4 of the series, it was labelled as "TYPE 2001" due to its marketing in said year.

Other appearances
 Mega Monster Battle: Ultra Galaxy (2009): Neos and Ultraseven 21 fight alongside other residents of the Land of Light against the evil Ultraman Belial.
 State Farm commercial (2014): Neos appeared in a commercial to promote the foreign insurance company.
 Tokyo Brand (2017): Neos made his cameo appearance in a video which promoted tourism to Tokyo, Japan.
 Life of Planet (2017): In a music video performed by Taiwanese band Mayday from their 9th studio album History of Tomorrow, directed by Muh Chen. Neos was seen fighting against Dark Baltan while dealing with humanity's distrust towards him, save for a young boy.
Ultra Galaxy Fight: The Absolute Conspriacy (2020): Neos and Ultraseven 21 fight alongside other Ultramen of the Land of Light against the evil Absolute Tartarus.

Home media
The series was released in the United States on DVD October 11, 2022 by Mill Creek Entertainment.

References

External links
Official Site

Ultra television series
2000 Japanese television series debuts
2001 Japanese television series endings
Television duos